Borohydride refers to the anion , which is also called tetrahydroborate, and its salts. Borohydride or hydroborate is also the term used for compounds containing , where n is an integer from 0 to 3, for example cyanoborohydride or cyanotrihydroborate  and triethylborohydride or triethylhydroborate . Borohydrides find wide use as reducing agents in organic synthesis. The most important borohydrides are lithium borohydride and sodium borohydride, but other salts are well known (see Table). Tetrahydroborates are also of academic and industrial interest in inorganic chemistry.

History
Alkali metal borohydrides were first described in 1940 by Hermann Irving Schlesinger and Herbert C. Brown. They synthesized lithium borohydride  from diborane :

, where M = Li, Na, K, Rb, Cs, etc.
Current methods involve reduction of trimethyl borate with sodium hydride.

Structure
In the borohydride anion and most of its modifications, boron has a tetrahedral structure. The reactivity of the B−H bonds depends on the other ligands. Electron-releasing ethyl groups as in triethylborohydride render the B−H center highly nucleophilic. In contrast, cyanoborohydride is a weaker reductant owing to the electron-withdrawing cyano substituent. The countercation also influences the reducing power of the reagent.

Uses
Sodium borohydride is the borohydride that is produced on the largest scale industrially, estimated at 5000 tons/year in 2002. The main use is for the reduction of sulfur dioxide to give sodium dithionite:

Dithionite is used to bleach wood pulp. Sodium borohydride is also used to reduce aldehydes and ketones in the production of pharmaceuticals including chloramphenicol, thiophenicol, vitamin A, atropine, and scopolamine, as well as many flavorings and aromas.

Potential applications
Because of their high hydrogen content, borohydride complexes and salts have been of interest in the context of hydrogen storage. Reminiscent of related work on ammonia borane, challenges are associated with slow kinetics and low yields of hydrogen as well as problems with regeneration of the parent borohydrides.

Coordination complexes

In its coordination complexes, the borohydride ion is bound to the metal by means of one to three bridging hydrogen atoms. In most such compounds, the  ligand is bidentate. Some homoleptic borohydride complexes are volatile. One example is uranium borohydride.

Metal borohydride complexes can often be prepared by a simple salt elimination reaction:

Decomposition
Some metal tetrahydroborates transform on heating to give metal borides. When the borohydride complex is volatile, this decomposition pathway is the basis of chemical vapor deposition (CVD), a way of depositing thin films of metal borides. For example, zirconium diboride  and hafnium diboride  can be prepared through CVD of the zirconium(IV) tetrahydroborate  and hafnium(IV) tetrahydroborate :

Metal diborides find uses as coatings because of their hardness, high melting point, strength, resistance to wear and corrosion, and good electrical conductivity.

References

External links

 Sodium Tetrahydroborate

 
Anions